IFK Örby is a Swedish football club located in Örby, Mark.

Background
IFK Örby currently plays in Division 4 Västergötland Södra which is the sixth tier of Swedish football. They play their home matches at the Örby IP in Örby.

The club is affiliated to Västergötlands Fotbollförbund.

Season to season

In their most successful period IFK Örby competed in the following divisions:

In recent seasons IFK Örby have competed in the following divisions:

Footnotes

External links
 IFK Örby – Official website
 IFK Örby on Facebook

Football clubs in Västra Götaland County
Idrottsföreningen Kamraterna